In differential geometry, the Dupin indicatrix is a method for characterising the local shape of a surface. Draw a plane parallel to the tangent plane and a small distance away from it. Consider the intersection of the surface  with this plane. The shape of the intersection is related to the Gaussian curvature. The Dupin indicatrix is the result of the limiting process as the plane approaches the tangent plane. The indicatrix was invented by Charles Dupin.

For elliptical points where the Gaussian curvature is positive the intersection will either be empty or form a closed curve. In the limit this curve will form an ellipse aligned with the principal directions.

For hyperbolic points, where the Gaussian curvature is negative, the intersection will form a hyperbola. Two different hyperbolas will be formed on either side of the tangent plane. These hyperbolas share the same axis and asymptotes. The directions of the asymptotes are the same as the asymptotic directions.

See also
 Euler's theorem (differential geometry)

References
 Full 1909 text (now out of copyright)

Differential geometry of surfaces
Surfaces